Amable de Bourzeis (6 April 1606, Volvic – 2 August 1672, Paris) was a French churchman, writer, hellenist, and Academician.

A founding member of the Académie française, in 1663 Jean-Baptiste Colbert also made him one of the five founding members of the Académie des Inscriptions et Belles-Lettres.

Publications (partial list) 
 Discours à monseigneur le prince palatin pour l'exhorter à entrer dans la communion de l'Église catholique, 1646, Read online
 Lettre d'un abbé à un président, sur la conformité de Augustin d'Hippone avec le concile de Trente, touchant la manière dont les justes peuvent délaisser Dieu, et estre ensuite délaissez de luy, 1649
 Contre l'adversaire du concile de Trente et de sainct Augustin : dialogue premier, où l'on découvre la confusion & les contradictions estranges des dogmes théologiques du P. Petau, & où l'on réfute un libelle du mesme père, intitulé insolemment « Dispute contre l'hétérodoxe », c'est-à-dire contre l'hérétique : où est aussi réfuté par occasion un petit libelle de M. Morel dont le titre est « Défense de la confession de la foy catholique alléguée, etc. », 1650, Read online
 Apologie du concile de Trente et de sainct Augustin : contre les nouvelles opinions du censeur latin de la Lettre franc̜oise d'un abbé à un evesque ; où est refutée aussi dans une preface une autre censure latine de la preface franc̜oise de la Lettre d'un abbé à un president, 1650
 Conférences de deux théologiens molinistes sur un libelle faussement intitulé : Les sentiments de saint Augustin et de toute l'Église, 1650
 Sermons sur divers mystères de la religion et plusieurs fêtes des saints, prêchés dans Paris, par l'abbé de Bourzeis, 1672
Ouvrages parfois attribués 
 Saint Augustin victorieux de Calvin et de Molina, ou Réfutation d'un livre intitulé « Le Secret du Jansénisme », 1652
 Traité des droits de la Reyne tres-chrestienne sur divers Estats de la monarchie d'Espagne, 1667

Sources and bibliography 
 Oscar Honoré, Honoré [Amable] de Bourzeïs. Un académicien oublié, le premier XXXVe fauteuil, Paris, 1879
 Akimid Edo [pseudonyme de Yasushi Noro], « Note sur la naissance et la mort d'Amable Bourzeis » in Courrier du Centre international Blaise Pascal, Clermont-Ferrand, 2002, -50
 Yasushi Noro, Un littérateur face aux événements du XVIIe : Amable Bourzeis et les événements dans sa biographie, thèse, Université Blaise Pascal, Clermont-Ferrand II, 2006
 Claude-François Lambert, Histoire littéraire du règne de Louis XIV, Prault, Paris, t. 1, 1753, -46
 Philippe Le Bas, L'Univers. Histoire et description de tous les peuples. Dictionnaire encyclopédique de la France, Firmin Didot, Paris, t. 3, 1842, 

1606 births
1672 deaths
Greek–French translators
Latin–French translators
French classical scholars
17th-century French writers
17th-century French male writers
French theologians
Members of the Académie des Inscriptions et Belles-Lettres
17th-century French translators